Peter Daniel Lunn (born 16 April 1970) is an English former first-class cricketer.

Lunn was born at Oxford in April 1970. He later studied at New College at the University of Oxford. He played first-class cricket for Oxford University while studying at Oxford, making his debut against Northamptonshire at Oxford in 1989. He played first-class cricket for Oxford until 1990, making sixteen appearances. Lunn scored 431 runs in his sixteen matches, at an average of 26.93 and a high score of 61, which was his only half century. As a leg break bowler, he bowled 97 overs but took only 3 wickets.

References

External links

1970 births
Living people
Cricketers from Oxford
Alumni of New College, Oxford
English cricketers
Oxford University cricketers